USS Hopestill (SP-191) was a United States Navy patrol vessel in commission from 1917 to 1919.

Hopestill was built as a civilian motorboat or motor yacht of the same name in 1916 by Robert Jacobs at City Island in the Bronx, New York. The U.S. Navy acquired her from her owner, Irving E. Raymond of New York City, in May 1917 for World War I service as a patrol vessel. She was commissioned as USS Hopestill (SP-191) at the New York Navy Yard at Brooklyn, New York, on 26 July 1917.

Hopestill was assigned to the 3rd Naval District and served as a harbor patrol vessel in New York Harbor until 26 April 1918, when she was reassigned to the New York Naval Hospital. In her new role, Hopestill carried patients for the hospital and stood by to transport emergency cases from ships in the harbor.

Hopestill completed this duty in July 1919 and was decommissioned. She was stricken from the Naval Vessel Register on 21 August and sold to J. S. Milne of Brooklyn on 16 September.

References

External links
 Department of the Navy: Navy History and Heritage Command: Online Library of Selected Images: Civilian Ships: Hopestill (American Motor Boat, 1916). Served as USS Hopestill (SP-191) in 1917-1919
 NavSource Online: Section Patrol Craft Photo Archive: Hopestill (SP 191)

Patrol vessels of the United States Navy
World War I patrol vessels of the United States
World War I auxiliary ships of the United States
Individual yachts
Ships built in City Island, Bronx
1916 ships